Lycogala is a genus of Amoebozoa, including the species Lycogala epidendrum.

References

Amoebozoa genera
Myxogastria